Tolpukhovo is a rural locality (a village) and the administrative center of Tolpukhovskoye Rural Settlement, Sobinsky District, Vladimir Oblast, Russia. The population was 782 as of 2010. There are 16 streets.

Geography 
Tolpukhovo is located 22 km north of Sobinka (the district's administrative centre) by road. Ryzhkovo is the nearest rural locality.

References 

Rural localities in Sobinsky District